The Sarah Jane Adventures is a British science fiction television programme that was produced by BBC Cymru Wales for CBBC, created by Russell T Davies, and starring Elisabeth Sladen. The programme is a spin-off of the long-running BBC science fiction programme Doctor Who and is aimed at a younger audience than Doctor Who. It focuses on the adventures of Sarah Jane Smith, an investigative journalist who, as a young woman, had numerous adventures across time and space with the Doctor. Following Sladen's sudden death from cancer, the BBC confirmed that the show would not return for a sixth series.

The series debuted on BBC One with a 60-minute special, "Invasion of the Bane", on 1 January 2007, and broadcast until Sladen’s death in 2011. It was nominated for a British Academy Children's Award in 2008 in the Drama category, and for a BAFTA Cymru in 2009 in the Children's Drama category. The programme won a Royal Television Society 2010 award for Best Children's Drama.

As of 30 November 2022, all of the series are on BBC iPlayer.

Series
A full series of ten 25-minute episodes began on 24 September 2007. The first series consisted of five two-part stories, and a second series, comprising six two-part stories, began airing on 29 September 2008. A third series, once again comprising six two-part stories to make a total of twelve episodes, with Russell T Davies serving as executive producer, aired from 15 October 2009 to 20 November 2009.

The fourth series was aired from 11 October 2010. An episode of another spin-off series, Sarah Jane's Alien Files, was shown immediately after each of the first episodes of the stories. Filming for three of six two-part serials planned for the fifth series was completed prior to Elisabeth Sladen's death on 19 April 2011. The BBC stated that no further episodes would be filmed. The fifth series was broadcast starting 3 October 2011 on Mondays and Tuesdays. It finished just two weeks later on 18 October 2011.

Background and development
In 2006, Children's BBC expressed an interest in producing a Doctor Who spin-off. Their initial idea was "a drama based on the idea of a young Doctor Who", but Russell T Davies vetoed this.  "Somehow, the idea of a fourteen year old Doctor, on Gallifrey inventing sonic screwdrivers, takes away from the mystery and intrigue of who he is and where he came from," said Davies. He suggested instead a series based on the Doctor's former companion Sarah Jane Smith.

The character of Sarah Jane Smith, played by Sladen, appeared in Doctor Who from 1973 to 1976, alongside both Jon Pertwee as the Third Doctor and Tom Baker as the Fourth Doctor. A pilot episode for another Doctor Who spin-off series, K-9 and Company, made in 1981, featured Sarah Jane and the robot dog K9; however, a full series was never commissioned. Sarah Jane and K9 returned to Doctor Who in various media many times over the years, most notably in the 20th anniversary special The Five Doctors (1983), and in episodes "School Reunion" (2006), "The Stolen Earth" / "Journey's End" (2008) and "The End of Time" (2010).

Sarah Jane is frequently voted the most popular Doctor Who companion by both Doctor Who fans and members of the general public.
That a Sarah Jane series was being developed was first confirmed in the BBC's in-house newsletter, Ariel, in early August 2006. These early rumours were associated with the working title Sarah Jane Investigates.

K9's only appearances in the show's first two series were a cameo in the special and an appearance in the last episode of the first series. This was due to the concurrent development of the independently produced children's series, K-9, which features a remodelled version of K9 with only indirect nods to Doctor Who. However, in 2009, K9 appeared with The Sarah Jane Adventures cast in a sketch for Comic Relief, and K9 appeared in six episodes of the third series, followed by two more appearances in the fourth series. He did not appear at all in Series 5.

Production
Production on the full series began in April 2007. Two of the five two-part stories were scripted by the special's co-writer Gareth Roberts.  Bad Girls and New Captain Scarlet writer Phil Ford wrote two stories and Phil Gladwin wrote one. Creator and executive producer Russell T Davies was going to write one story but was forced to drop out due to other work commitments.

Tenth anniversary
For the tenth anniversary of the show, an event was held 29 July 2017 at Cardiff University Students' Union, with proceeds going to Ty Hafan Hospice for Children. A total of £6643.35 was raised by the sale of tickets to the event and merchandise. Members of the cast and crew that took part in the event were Tommy Knight, Anjli Mohindra, Yasmin Paige, Sinead Michael, Mina Anwar, Katy Manning, Paul Marc Davis, Phil Ford, Gary Russell, Joe Lidster, Sam Watts, Richard Wisker, Cheryl Rowlands, Scott Handcock, Brian Miller, John Leeson, Mat Irvine and Chris Johnson. The event was recorded and was released onto DVD and Blu-ray and could be bought exclusively through the event's website.

Cast and crew

In addition to Sladen, the first series of the programme stars Yasmin Paige as Maria Jackson, Sarah Jane's 13-year-old neighbour in Ealing, west London, and Tommy Knight as a boy named Luke, who is adopted by Sarah Jane at the conclusion of the introductory story. The third member of Sarah Jane's young entourage is 14-year-old called Clyde Langer, played by Daniel Anthony, who is introduced in the first episode of the proper series. Actress Porsha Lawrence Mavour briefly played Maria's friend, Kelsey Hooper, in the 2007 New Year's Day special Invasion of the Bane which was created before the start of the series. Maria and her family are written out of the series in the first story of the second series, The Last Sontaran, but Maria and her father return briefly in the second part of The Mark of the Berserker. In the second story of that series, The Day of the Clown, several new regular cast members are introduced: Rani Chandra and her parents, Haresh, and Gita (played by Anjli Mohindra, Ace Bhatti, and Mina Anwar, respectively).

Joseph Millson appears throughout the first series as Maria's recently separated father, Alan, with Chrissie Jackson, Maria's mother, played by Juliet Cowan. One other regular is Alexander Armstrong of comedy duo Armstrong and Miller, who provides the voice of Mr Smith, an extraterrestrial computer in Sarah Jane's attic. The 2007 special featured Samantha Bond as the scheming villain Mrs Wormwood and Jamie Davis as her PR agent Davey. The first series included among its guest cast Jane Asher as Sarah Jane's childhood friend Andrea Yates, Floella Benjamin as Professor Rivers, who returned in Series 2, Series 3 and Series 5, and Phyllida Law as Bea Nelson-Stanley. The second series guest starred Bradley Walsh as an evil alien clown in the story The Day of the Clown and Russ Abbot as a sinister astrologer in Secrets of the Stars. Also appearing in the second series were Gary Beadle and Jocelyn Jee Esien, who portrayed Clyde's parents Paul and Carla in The Mark of the Berserker; Esien reprised her role briefly in Series 4 and more prominently in series 5. Nicholas Courtney guest starred in Enemy of the Bane as classic Doctor Who character Sir Alistair Lethbridge-Stewart, and Samantha Bond also returned as Wormwood for the episode.

The original executive producers for The Sarah Jane Adventures were Phil Collinson, Russell T Davies and Julie Gardner. Susie Liggat produced the pilot, but Matthew Bouch worked as producer of the series. Co-writer Gareth Roberts, writing in Doctor Who Magazine, said, "We're all determined that this will be a big, full-blooded drama; that nobody should ever think of it as 'just' a children's programme." Sue Nott was the executive producer of the second series for CBBC.

In December 2007, the BBC released a statement that Julie Gardner would be replaced by Piers Wenger as executive producer for Doctor Who in January 2009, but that she would continue to executive-produce Torchwood and The Sarah Jane Adventures through 2008.

The fourth series in 2010 was executive produced by Russell T Davies and Nikki Wilson, and the producers were Brian Minchin and frequent writer Phil Ford. During this series, Cyril Nri was introduced as a new recurring character called The Shopkeeper. The production team remained in place for the completed episodes of Series 5, which were shot concurrently with Series 4. The show's abbreviated fifth and final series introduced a new main character named Sky, played by Sinead Michael. The episode that introduced Sky also featured a return appearance by the Shopkeeper, but the fact that the second half of the series was never produced left his story arc, as well as other ongoing plot points, unresolved. A special edition of Doctor Who Magazine, The Sarah Jane Companion Volume 3, published in August 2012, detailed the plotlines of the three unfilmed stories.

Cast

Doctor Who characters
Including K9 and Sarah Jane, some characters from the past or current run of Doctor Who have appeared in The Sarah Jane Adventures.

Numerous others have been referenced in dialogue. Several former companions of the Doctor are referenced in the story Death of the Doctor, and the episode also includes brief on-screen flashbacks showing the Third, Fourth and Tenth Doctors. Companion Harry Sullivan is referenced separately in dialogue on several occasions and a photograph of the character is visible in one episode. In an issue of Doctor Who Magazine, Sophie Aldred was read an email from Russell T. Davies, in which he declared his plans to bring Ace into a story had the show continued, and she was alluded to at the end of The Death of the Doctor when the fates of Harry Sullivan, Ian Chesterton, Barbara Wright, Ben Jackson, Polly, Tegan Jovanka, and Ace are revealed. The episode Sky was originally to have featured the Eleventh Doctor, but Matt Smith was not available.

Episodes

The Sarah Jane Adventures was first seen by its original British audience in the form of a 60-minute New Year's Day special in 2007, titled "Invasion of the Bane", which was co-written by Russell T Davies and Gareth Roberts. "Invasion of the Bane" was not a pilot, although the story does contains many conventional introductory elements common to pilots. Creator Russell T Davies has commented upon the exceptional broadcast situation, saying "Sarah Jane Adventures is slightly unusual in that it was commissioned before we'd written the script. If we'd written a load of rubbish, they'd still have had to make it." He refers to "Invasion of the Bane" simply as the "first episode". The story focused on Sarah Jane's investigation of a popular and addictive soft drink called Bubble Shock!.

Series one of the show aired in September of that year, consisting of five two-part half-hour stories. Individual half-hour episodes aired once a week on BBC One, with episodes airing a week ahead on children's digital channel CBBC. The final part aired in November 2007. The second series started in September 2008 using the same format, with six stories instead of five, ending the series in December. The third series started 15 October 2009, twice weekly (Thursdays and Fridays) on BBC One from 15 October to 20 November. The fourth series aired from 11 October 2010. The first of each story pair was accompanied by an episode of Sarah Jane's Alien Files, a set of 25-minute episodes in which a member of the cast updates Mr. Smith's database about certain aliens. It accompanied series 4 of the programme.

Due to the illness of Elisabeth Sladen, and her death on 19 April 2011, filming for the second half of the fifth series, which was due to air in the autumn of 2011, was postponed and later cancelled. Filming for three stories of the fifth series had been finished, and thus post-production on these stories was completed. The final series was aired from 3 to 18 October 2011 on CBBC and ended with a tribute to Elisabeth Sladen in the form of a video montage of scenes from the series and a couple of episodes of Doctor Who and the ending text "And the story goes on... forever."

The script of the unfilmed Sarah Jane Adventures episode "The Thirteenth Floor" was rewritten and broadcast as an episode of Wizards vs Aliens.

Farewell, Sarah Jane 
On 19 April 2020 a special 13-minute webcast mini episode entitled Farewell, Sarah Jane aired on Doctor Who social media channels as a tribute to Elisabeth Sladen. During this story, it was implied that Sarah Jane had been killed while preventing an alien invasion. As such, a memorial service was held, attended by Luke, Clyde, Rani, Sky and Maria, accompanied by their friends and families (among them several of the Doctor's former companions). Apart from an interruption from, and final confrontation with, the Trickster, the memorial went smoothly, and the group prepare to leave 13 Bannerman Road once more. Rani, however, stays behind, and, in her final conversation with Mr. Smith, expresses her hopes that Sarah Jane is travelling with the Doctor (who was absent, since her death would have broken both his (or her) hearts, according to Jo Grant) once again. It was written by Russell T Davies.

The story acted as an epilogue to the series narrated by Jacob Dudman and featured Tommy Knight, Daniel Anthony, Anjli Mohindra, Katy Manning, Mina Anwar all in their respective roles from the series and also included Sophie Aldred, who portrayed Ace, a companion to the Seventh Doctor. The episode's credits thanked Sacha Dhawan, Scott Handcock and Stuart Humphryes.

Spin-offs

Beyond Bannerman Road: Rani Takes on the World 
On 19 July 2022, it was announced that Big Finish Productions would produce an audio spin-off of The Sarah Jane Adventures set to release in April 2023, which features Rani Chandra (Anjli Mohindra) as the protagonist. The audio spin-off is set 15 years after the events of the series and will also feature Clyde Langer (Daniel Anthony) as well as Gita Chandra (Mina Anwar), Rani's mother.

Critical response
The Sarah Jane Adventures has been generally well received by critics and the viewing public. At the end of the first series, Abi Grant of The Daily Telegraph wrote: "With the debate about the future of children's TV still rumbling on, this is what the BBC does best, and despite lacking the production values of Doctor Who, it's still top tea-time programming." Daniel Martin of The Guardian described the show as looking very promising and more convincing than another Doctor Who spinoff Torchwood. Review website DVD Talk called the series "wonderful", "thoughtful" and "imaginative children's entertainment" that was highly recommended. The series also received praise for its willingness to tackle "darker themes [such as] Alzheimer's, homelessness and loss."

At Metacritic, the first series received a generally favourable score of 66 out of 100 based on five critics. As the series progressed reviews became slightly more positive with DVD Talk reviewer David Cornelius saying that the "second series is even better than the first." However Eric Profancik from DVD Verdict stated that the second series suffered from "poor scripts and horrible acting", criticising it for having "simple plots, too many conveniences and having corny humour." Series three is described by Guy Clapperton of review site ScreenJabber.com as being slightly braver than its predecessors, while Bullz-eye.com described it as "a sweet, fun little show, with some neat ideas" with "its heart very much in the right place." Reviews for the final series were sympathetic for the series' end and the unavoidably incomplete nature of the series (following the death of Elisabeth Sladen) and its story arcs. Stephen Kelly from The Guardian said that it was "a fitting tribute to Elisabeth Sladen" and has occupied a "unique place in the Whoniverse".

Awards and nominations

International broadcast
BBC Worldwide's children's channel in Canada, BBC Kids, began broadcasting The Sarah Jane Adventures with "Invasion of the Bane" on 13 January 2008, airing the rest of the series back-to-back on Sundays thereafter.
The South African channel SABC 2 started airing the series beginning on 9 February 2008. The Hong Kong channel ATV World, which has also aired Doctor Who and Torchwood, aired this series starting 17 February 2008. The first series began airing on Sci Fi in the USA beginning on 11 April 2008, but this is the only series broadcast on American television as of Summer 2010, though later series have continued to be released on DVD in America without a prior television broadcast. In Australia, The Sarah Jane Adventures started on 31 October 2008 on Nickelodeon Australia. In Brazil, the show started airing on 19 November 2012 on TV Cultura, right after their broadcast of Doctor Who series 6 ended. It also screens in New Zealand on Nickelodeon New Zealand, and in Belgium on Ketnet. In 2013 the show started airing on JeemTV in Arabic. Various seasons of the series has also been broadcast multiple times on the Swedish children's Channel 'Barnkanalen' in Swedish.

Merchandising

Toys
Character Options have been awarded a licence to produce The Sarah Jane Adventure play sets, action figures, and a 'Sonic Lipstick' toy.
Four 2-figure sets have been released: Sarah Jane and Star Poet; Sarah Jane and General Kudlak; Sarah Jane and Child Slitheen and Sarah Jane and Graske. Also released are Sarah Jane's Sonic Lipstick with Watch Scanner and Alien Communicator. Character Options have now discontinued the range due to lack of customer interest.

Battles in Time Trading Cards Adventurer Set 
The Adventurer The Sarah Jane Adventures series of Doctor Who: Battles in Time trading cards was a bonus set of 10 limited edition, additional cards (plus one cover card) released exclusively with Issue 62 and packaged in a clear plastic wrap.

With the Doctor Who: Battles in Time (magazine) being extended beyond its original number of proposed issues, the Adventurer The Sarah Jane Adventures cards saw the series expanded once more by the inclusion of this popular spin-off series which frequently crossed-over to the parent series.

The Adventurer series consisted of 10 individual Common cards referenced by the prefix SJA, cards also showed their individual series number 01-10

Audio adventures
Ten audiobooks have been released on CD, all but the last two read by the series lead, Elisabeth Sladen, who read them in the first person in character as Sarah Jane. The final two books, released in November 2011 after Sladen's death, were read by Daniel Anthony and Anjli Mohindra, respectively, though not as their characters.

The first two were the first time that BBC Audiobooks had commissioned new content for exclusive release on audio.

A 20-minute mini-episode in two parts called "The Monster Hunt" written by Trevor Baxendale and read by Anjli Mohindra was made especially for the Monster Hunt game on the Sarah Jane Adventures website. Two more comics were released "Return of the Krulius" and  "Defending Bannerman Road". All comics were available as a pdf and a free mp3 download on the official Sarah Jane Adventures website.

Comics 
Five The Sarah Jane Adventures comics were released on the official Sarah Jane Adventures website. Four of them were comic adventures with audio narration by Anjli Mohindra. A pdf document and a MP3 audio track was available to download of the comics. An online version of The Silver Bullet, presented, in full, a comic written and drawn by Clyde and briefly seen in, the episode The Curse of Clyde Langer.

Novelisations
The Sarah Jane Adventures merchandising revived the concept of the novelisation, which had been part of the Doctor Who franchise from the 1970s to the 1990s (principally under the editorship of author and former Who script editor Terrance Dicks). The first series and most of the second were adapted in this way, but later series saw only a few releases and a transition from print to e-books.

In September 2010, Pearson Education published four simplified novelisations based on stories from the third series:

Magazines and Books
Although there has never been a Sarah Jane Adventures magazine there have been three special editions of the Doctor Who Magazine, focused on the Sarah Jane Adventures, as well as regular mentions in the standard editions of Doctor Who Magazine.

Home media

DVD

Blu-ray

Notes

References

External links
 

 
 BBC Sarah Jane Adventures Merchandise
 
 BBC Norfolk webTV Elisabeth Sladen previews The Sarah Jane Adventures

Past official BBC websites
The Sarah Jane Adventures Series 2,3,4 via Internet Archive
The Sarah Jane Adventures Series 1 via Internet Archive

 
2000s British science fiction television series
2010s British science fiction television series
2007 British television series debuts
2011 British television series endings
BBC children's television shows
British science fiction television shows
Doctor Who spin-offs
English-language television shows
Television shows set in London
British television spin-offs
CBBC shows
BBC Cymru Wales television shows
Television series about extraterrestrial life
Television series about teenagers
Television series by BBC Studios
Television series created by Russell T Davies
British time travel television series